Patsy O'Leary (born Patricia O'Day, September 8, 1910, date of death unknown) was an Irish-American actress known for her work on Mack Sennett comedies in the late 1920s and early 1930s.

Biography 
O'Leary was born in County Cork, Ireland, to an Irish mother and a French father; the family relocated to Paris when O'Leary was a girl before heading to America and settling in Tacoma, Washington. She got into acting as a child on Sennett's lot. She appeared in dozens of films over the course of her career (mostly comedies and Westerns) and also owned her own restaurant in Hollywood for a time. She married Dr. Clement J. Joynt in 1930 and appears to have retired from acting soon after. She divorced Joynt in 1936.

Filmography 

 The Flirty Sleepwalker (1932) 
 Half Holiday (1931)
 One More Chance (1931)
 I Surrender Dear (1931)
 Poker Widows (1931)
 The World Flier (1931)
 Too Many Husbands (1931)
 The Fainting Lover (1931)
 In Conference (1931)
 Just a Bear (1931)
 The Dog Doctor (1931)
 The College Vamp (1931)
 A Hollywood Theme Song (1930)
 Racket Cheers (1930)
 Don't Bite Your Dentist (1930)
 Take Your Medicine (1930)
 Grandma's Girl (1930)
 Midnight Daddies (1930)
 The Bluffer (1930)
 Vacation Loves (1930)
 Average Husband (1930)
 Hello, Television (1930)
 Goodbye Legs (1930)
 The Chumps (1930)
 Campus Crushes (1930)
 Fat Wives for Thin (1930)
 Radio Kisses (1930)
 Honeymoon Zeppelin (1930)
 He Trumped Her Ace (1930)
 Bulls and Bears (1930)
 Uppercut O'Brien (1929)
 The New Half Back (1929)
 Clancy at the Bat (1929)
 A Hollywood Star (1929)
 The Golfers (1929)
 The Lunkhead (1929)
 The Constabule (1929)
 The Barber's Daughter (1929)
 Jazz Mamas (1929)
 Motoring Mamas (1929)
 Girl Crazy (1929)
 The Bees' Buzz (1929)
 Isle of Lost Men (1928)
 The Campus Carmen (1929)
 A Dumb Waiter (1928)
 Girl-Shy Cowboy (1928)
 The Swim Princess (1928)
 Love at First Flight (1928)
 Run, Girl, Run (1928)
 The Girl from Everywhere (1927)

References

External links

1910 births
Year of death missing
20th-century American actresses
American film actresses
American silent film actresses
Irish film actresses
Irish silent film actresses